Das Nusch-Nuschi (The Nusch-Nuschi), Op. 20, is an opera in one act by Paul Hindemith, with a German libretto by Franz Blei.

Subtitled A Play for Burmese Marionettes in One Act (Ein Spiel für burmanische Marionetten in einem Akt), it is a staged work with both singers and dancers. It is the second work in a triptych of expressionist one-act operas, the others being Mörder, Hoffnung der Frauen and Sancta Susanna. They are the first operas written by Hindemith. The first two were premiered together at the Württembergisches Landestheater in Stuttgart on 4 June 1921; all three were performed at the Oper Frankfurt in 1922.

History 
Das Nusch-Nuschi was the second piece in a triptych of one-act operas by Hindemith influenced by Expressionism. Hindemith experienced World War I as a soldier in Belgium and Northern France. In a second wave of expressionism after the war, he became interested in the movement. It was a period of changes in society. Hindemith describes: "the old world exploded".

Das Nusch-Nuschi is based on a 1904 play by Franz Blei, subtitled "A Play for Burmese Marionettes". Blei was a Wagner enthusiast when he was young, but turned to contributing to the satirical weekly Simplicissimus and wrote plays for the cabaret  (The Eleven Executioners), founded in Munich and focused on puppet satire. He had his Nusch-Nuschi reprinted in 1913 in an issue of Die Aktion that was dedicated to his work.

While Mörder, Hoffnung der Frauen deals with brutality between the sexes, Das Nusch-Nuschi is in a way even "more subversive" as it ridicules brutality and intense emotions.

Roles

Music 
He composed the work in 1920 and finished it on 14 August of that year. It is playful with elements of slapstick comedy, in contrast with the other two pieces of the triptych. The opera is in the tradition of commedia dell'arte with its stereotype characters. It is a satire on European drama and opera. Hindemith uses traditional musical forms, often in parody. A quote from Wagner's Tristan und Isolde, Marke's "Mir dies!", was regarded as a sacrilege by some of Hindemith's contemporaries. Hindemith comments the third dance: "The following 'choral fugue' (with all mod cons: augmentation, diminutions, stretto and basso ostinato) simply thank their existence to an unfortunate coincidence: they were conceived by the composer. They have no further purpose than this: to incorporate themselves stylishly into the framework of this picture and provide all 'experts' with the opportunity to bark about the incredibly bad taste of their creator. Hallelujah! – It is essential that this piece be danced (or rather wobbled to) by two eunuchs with incredibly fat and naked bellies."

Hindemith also quotes from Till Eulenspiegel by Richard Strauss, and parodies the exotic sounds of Mahler’s Das Lied von der Erde, using celesta, mandolin, harp and English horn. He contrasts tender music with "the screeches of two trained monkeys", and parodies the "neo-Baroque" style of Max Reger with a grotesque "choral fugue".

Performances 
The opera was first performed, together with Mörder, Hoffnung der Frauen, on 4 June 1921 at the Württembergisches Landestheater in Stuttgart, conducted by Fritz Busch and staged by Otto Erhardt. The artist Oskar Schlemmer was responsible for the stage set, costumes and choreography. The duration is given as 60 minutes.

References 

Sources

External links 

Operas
Operas by Paul Hindemith
German-language operas
1921 operas
One-act operas
Operas based on plays